Otto VIII, Count of Hoya (1530 – 25 February 1582 at Hoya Castle in Hoya, Germany) was the last ruling Count of Hoya.

Life 
Otto was the third son of Count Jobst II and his wife Anna of Gleichen.  At first, he was canon in Cologne and Verden.  After the childless death of his older brother Albert II in 1563, Otto VIII and his brother Eric V, took up government of the county.

Otto married in 1568 to Agnes of Bentheim-Steinfurt, the widow of Count John II of Rietberg, who was also the mother of Armgard, who was the wife of Otto's brother Eric.  After Eric also died childless in 1575, Otto ruled the county alone.

"Otto, Count of Hoya and Burghausen," signed the Formula of Concord of 1577, and the Book of Concord of 1580.

Otto VIII died childless on 25 November 1582 at Hoya Castle.  He was buried in the church of St. Martin in Nienburg; his tomb is located in the hall below the tower.  With his death, the House of Hoya died out, and the county fell back to the Duchy of Brunswick-Lüneburg as a possession of Frederick Ulrich first and then of William August.

References 
 Heinrich Gade: Historisch-geographisch-statistische Beschreibung der Grafschaften Hoya und Diepholz, Nienburg, 1901
 Wilhelm Hodenberg (ed.): Hoyer Urkundenbuch, Hannover, 1848–1856
 Bernd Ulrich Hucker: Die Grafen von Hoya, Hoya, 1993
 Museum Nienburg: Die Grafschaften Bruchhausen, Diepholz, Hoya und Wölpe, Nienburg, 2000

Footnotes

Counts of Hoya
1530 births
1582 deaths
16th-century German people
Burials at St. Martin Church, Nienburg